Constituent Assembly elections were held in Norway during the Autumn of 1814. The Assembly approved the November constitution, ratified the Union with Sweden and disbanded. As political parties were not officially established until 1884, all those elected were independents.

Results

References

Elections in Norway
Norway
Constituent